semgrep or Semgrep CLI is a free open-source static code analysis tool developed by Return To Corporation (usually referred to as r2c) and open-source contributors. It has stable support for Go, Java, JavaScript, JSON, Python, and Ruby. It has experimental support for eleven other languages, as well as a language agnostic mode.

The name is a combination of semantic and grep, referring to semgrep being a text search command-line utility that is aware of source code semantics.

Services  
To complement semgrep, r2c provides a continuous integration service (called Semgrep CI) and maintains a rule library (called Semgrep Registry). Basic individual use of these services are offered for free while paid tiers cover team and commercial use-cases.

Compared to other popular static application security testing (SAST) tools, Semgrep CI is the only one with an open source engine which is able to run on private codes for free.

History  
Semgrep CLI was based on sgrep which was an open source tool part of pfff, a program analysis library developed at Facebook in 2009. Pfff was inspired by Coccinelle, an open-source utility for programs written in C. Yoann Padioleau, the original author of sgrep and a contributor to Coccinelle joined r2c in 2019. sgrep was forked by r2c from pfff. In 2020 r2c's sgrep fork was renamed to semgrep to avoid name collisions with existing projects.

Redpoint Ventures and Sequoia Capital backed r2c in an unannounced seed round and later also funded a Series A round with $13 million in 2020. The company's product portfolio consisted only of Semgrep and its ecosystem at the time.

The Open Web Application Security Project (OWASP) listed Semgrep in its source code analysis tools list. As of 2021 February, Semgrep has 41 contributors and 2900 stars on GitHub. From Docker Hub it was pulled more than a million times.

Usage 

Semgrep can be installed with Homebrew or pip. Additionally it can run without installation on Docker. Analysis can be done without the need of custom configuration, and by utilizing rulesets created by r2c and open source contributors. The tool also allows users to write their own patterns and rules through the CLI using a pattern language unique to semgrep. A free online rule editor and a tutorial are also available.

See also 

 Static analysis tool
 List of tools for static code analysis
 Semantics (computer science)

References

External links 
 Semgrep website
 Semgrep repository on GitHub
 Pfff repository on GitHub
 Medium post on Semgrep by Isaac Evans, CEO of r2c

Static program analysis tools
Software review
Free software testing tools